Daniel James Gercke (October 9, 1874 – March 19, 1964) was an American prelate of the Roman Catholic Church. He served as bishop of the Diocese of Tucson in Arizona from 1923 to 1960.

Biography

Early life 
Daniel Gercke was born in the Holmesburg section of Philadelphia, Pennsylvania, to Christopher and Catherine (née Shea) Gercke. He attended St. Joseph's College in Philadelphia, from where he obtained a Bachelor of Arts degree in 1891. He completed his theological studies at St. Charles Borromeo Seminary in Overbrook.

Priesthood 
Gercke was ordained to the priesthood by Archbishop Patrick Ryan on June 1, 1901. He then served as a curate at St. Joseph's Parish in Girardville, Pennsylvania, and afterwards at Holy Trinity Parish in Philadelphia. He briefly served at St. Mary's in Philadelphia before going to Vigan City, Philippines, in 1903. He served as vicar general of the Diocese of Nueva Cáceres in the Philippines from 1910 to 1919. 

Gercke was named a domestic prelate by Pope Benedict XV in 1915, and returned to Philadelphia in 1919. He then served as rector of the Cathedral of SS. Peter and Paul.

Bishop of Tucson 
On June 21, 1923, Gercke was appointed the third bishop of the Diocese of Tucson by Pope Pius XI. He received his episcopal consecration on November 6, 1923, from Cardinal Dennis Dougherty, with Bishops John MacGinley and James Paul McCloskey serving as co-consecrators.

Retirement and legacy 
On September 28, 1960, Pope Paul VI accepted Gercke's resignation as bishop of Tucson and named him as titular archbishop of Cotyaeum on the same date.Daniel Gercke died on March 19, 1964, at age 89.

References

1874 births
1964 deaths
Saint Joseph's University alumni
St. Charles Borromeo Seminary alumni
Clergy from Philadelphia
20th-century Roman Catholic bishops in the United States